Sir William Henry Houldsworth, 1st Baronet   (20 August 1834 – 18 April 1917) was a British mill-owner in Reddish, Lancashire.  He was Conservative MP for Manchester North West from 1883 to 1906, and sometime chairman of the Fine Cotton Spinners' Association.  He was made a baronet in 1887.

Life

William Henry Houldsworth was born on the 20th of August 1834, as the 4th and youngest son of Henry Houldworth (1797-1868) and Helen Hamilton. Houldworth's mother died while he was very young; while her exact date of death is unknown, his father remarried in 1838. Houldsworth bought farmland by the Stockport Branch Canal in Reddish in the 1860s and built Reddish Mill, then the largest cotton-spinning mill in the world (started 1863, completed 1865).  Four members of the Houldsworth family were 60% shareholders in the Reddish Spinning Company Limited which built the North Mill (started 1870) and the Middle Mill (started 1874).  An Institute (now Houldsworth working men's club) was completed in 1874.  All the above were designed by the architect Abraham Stott.  Houldsworth commissioned the architect Alfred Waterhouse to design St. Elisabeth's church, rectory and school.  All the above buildings are still standing.

The start of a model village was also laid out, Houldsworth Model Village, with a variety of houses built in front of the mill.  Some of the houses have been demolished, but those in Houldsworth Street and Liverpool Street remain.

He was created a baronet in 1887 as Sir William Henry Houldsworth, of Reddish, in the Parish of Manchester, in the County Palatine of Lancaster, and of Coodham in the Parish of Symington in the County of Ayr.

The City of Manchester made him a freeman in 1905, and the Victoria University of Manchester awarded him an honorary LLD.  In later life, Houldsworth moved away from Reddish and Manchester, and concentrated on his estate, Coodham, Ayrshire in Scotland, where he built a domestic chapel designed by Alfred Waterhouse.

Legacy
Several features in Reddish are named after Houldsworth.  A drinking fountain and four-faced clock, paid for by public subscription, was unveiled in Houldsworth Square on 11 September 1920.

The oldest block of Hulme Hall, Manchester a hall of residence for the University of Manchester which was largely funded in its infancy during the 1870s by Houldsworth, is named after him.

Family
Houldsworth married Elisabeth Graham Crum, daughter of Walter Crum.

References

Notes

External links

The aerial view at spinningtheweb shows Houldsworth's mill (to the left of the road running vertically), the canal (running horizontally) and the housing (in front of the mill).  St Elisabeth's church with its tower is at the top of the picture (above the mill).  The school is to the left of the church and the WMC is the large building to the right of the church.  One of Reddish Spinning Co Ltd's mills is at the top-left of the picture.  The mill to the right is Broadstone mill; the right-hand half of the structure, both chimneys and the engine house (at the centre) have been demolished.

 

English industrialists
British textile industry businesspeople
Deputy Lieutenants of Ayrshire
Directors of the London and North Western Railway
1834 births
1917 deaths
Conservative Party (UK) MPs for English constituencies
UK MPs 1880–1885
UK MPs 1885–1886
UK MPs 1886–1892
UK MPs 1892–1895
UK MPs 1895–1900
UK MPs 1900–1906
People from Ardwick
People from Reddish
Houldsworth, William Henry, 1st Baronet
Cotton industry in England
19th-century English businesspeople
20th-century English businesspeople
Members of the Parliament of the United Kingdom for Manchester
Hulme Trust